Joseph D'Aquin (14 January 1732 – 11 July 1815) was an early pioneer in the field of psychiatry.

Biography 
Joseph D'Aquin (or Daquin) was born in 1732 in Chambéry, in the duchy of Savoy, part of the Kingdom of Sardinia. He attended medical school at the University of Turin, where he graduated in 1757. He also studied at Montpellier and Paris. In 1791, he published a book entitled Philosophy of madness, which some consider the first book in the field of psychiatry. However, his recognition has been limited by the fact that Philippe Pinel never cited the work of Joseph D'Aquin in his famous medical and philosophical Traité médico-philosophique sur l'aliénation mentale; ou la manie published in 1801.

Literary works 
 À ses Concitoyens (de vaccine...), 13 pages
 Analyse des eaux thermales d'Aix en Savoye (Thermal waters analysis of Aix in Savoy), 1772, published by F. Gorrin
 Analyse des prétendues eaux ferrugineuses de la Boisse, situées près de Chambéry, 1777, published by J. Lullin, 35 pages
 Topographie medicale de la ville de Chambery et de ses environs (Medical topography of the city of Chambery and its environs), 1787, published by F. Gorrin, 151 pages
 Défense de la topographie médicale de Chambery, 1788, published by F. Gorrin, 58 pages
 La Philosophie de la folie (The philosophy of madness), 1791, First edition.
 La Philosophie de la folie (The philosophy of madness), 1804, Second edition dedicated to Philippe Pinel.
 Des eaux thermales d'Aix dans le département du Mont-Blanc: de leurs vertus médicales.. (Thermal waters of Aix in the Mont Blanc region: their medical virtues...), 1808, published by P. Cléaz, 369 pages

Tributes and awards 
 Member of the Academy of Sciences, Humanities and Arts of Lyon
 Member of the Agricultural Society of Turin
 Permanent Secretary of the Agricultural Society of Chambéry
 Correspondent of the Royal Society of Medicine in Paris, which awarded J. D'Aquin a gold medal for his work entitled "Medical Topography of the city of Chambéry and its environs" published in 1787.

References 
 Joseph Daquin. (2015, March 26). Wikipédia, l'encyclopédie libre. Retrieved June 21, 2016, from http://fr.wikipedia.org/w/index.php?title=Joseph_Daquin&oldid=113276139.

Further reading 
 Caire M. (1996) "Une lettre inedite de Joseph Daquin: Le plan du journal sur les fous", Hist. Sci. Med., Paris, 30, pp. 181–188.
 Nyffeler J.R. (1961) Joseph Daquin und seine "Philosophie de la folie", Juris, Zurich.

1732 births
1815 deaths
French psychiatrists
History of psychiatry